Biographers are authors who write an account of another person's life, while autobiographers are authors who write their own biography.

Biographers
Countries of working life: Ab=Arabia, AG=Ancient Greece, Al=Australia, Am=Armenian, AR=Ancient Rome, Au=Austria, AH=Austria/Hungary, Ca=Canada, En=England, Fl=Finland, Fr=France, Ge=Germany, Id=Indonesia, In=India, Ir=Ireland, Is=Israel, Jp=Japan, Nw=Norway, SA=South Africa, Sc=Scotland, SL=Sierra Leone, So=Somalia, Sp=Spain, Sw=Sweden, TT=Trinidad & Tobago, US=United States, Ve=Venezuela, Wl=Wales

A–G

Hermann Abert (Ge, 1871–1927) – Robert Schumann, Niccolò Jommelli, W. A. Mozart
Alfred Ainger (En, 1837–1904) – Charles Lamb
Ellis Amburn (US, 1933–2018) – Roy Orbison, Buddy Holly, Jack Kerouac, Elizabeth Taylor, Warren Beatty and Janis Joplin
Rudolph Angermüller (Ge, 1940–2021) – Antonio Salieri, W. A. Mozart
Núria Añó (Sp. born 1973) – Salka Viertel
Marie Célestine Amélie d'Armaillé (1830–1918) – Catherine de Bourbon, Élisabeth of France, Marie Leszczyńska, Marie Antoinette, Marie-Thérèse, Duchess of Angoulême, Septimanie d'Egmont), Désirée Clary
Rosemary Ashton (Sc/En, born 1947) – George Eliot
Deborah Baker (US, living) – Allen Ginsberg and Laura Riding
Lady Elizabeth Philippa Biddulph (En, 1834–1916) – Charles Yorke, 4th Earl of Hardwicke
Jennie M. Bingham (US, 1859–1933) — Anthony Ashley-Cooper, 7th Earl of Shaftesbury, Charlotte Brontë, Margaret Fuller, Charles Lamb, Briton Rivière
Lucie Boissonnas (1839–1877) – Robert E. Lee
James Boswell (Sc, 1740–1795) – Samuel Johnson
Paula Broadwell (US, born 1972) – David Petraeus
Max Brod (AH/Is, 1884–1968) – Franz Kafka
Leslie Brody (US, born 1952) – Jessica Mitford
Vincent Brome (En, 1910–2004) – various writers
Egerton Brydges (En, 1762–1837) – English writers
Andrea Cagan (US, living) – Diana Ross
Thomas Carlyle (Sc, 1795–1881) – John Sterling and Frederick the Great
Robert A. Caro (US, born 1935) – Robert Moses and Lyndon B. Johnson
Humphrey Carpenter (En, 1946–2005) – J. R. R. Tolkien, W. H. Auden, Ezra Pound, Evelyn Waugh, Benjamin Britten Robert Runcie and Spike Milligan
Virginia Spencer Carr (US, 1929–2012) – Carson McCullers, Paul Bowles and John Dos Passos
Charles Castle (En, 1939–2013) – Noël Coward, Joan Crawford, Oliver Messel, Margaret, Duchess of Argyll, La Belle Otero, Richard Tauber
George Cavendish (En, 1494 – c. 1562) – Thomas Wolsey
Nirad C. Chaudhuri (In, 1897–1999) – Clive of India and Max Müller
Ron Chernow (US, born 1949)
Na Chokkan (In, born 1977) – Sachin Tendulkar, Dhirubhai Ambani, Charlie Chaplin, Rahul Dravid, Azim Premji, Lakshmi Mittal, Walt Disney etc. in Tamil
Vincent Cronin (En, 1924–2011) – Napoleon, Louis XVI and Marie Antoinette and Catherine the Great
Douglas Day (US, 1932–2004) – Malcolm Lowry
Thomas DiLorenzo (US, born 1954) – Abraham Lincoln
Damon DiMarco (US, born 1971) – Roy Simmons
Richard Ellmann (US, 1918–1987) – James Joyce, Oscar Wilde and W. B. Yeats
Alberthiene Endah (Id, living) – Chrisye, Krisdayanti and Raam Punjabi
Ivar Eskeland (Nw, 1927–2005) – decorated with the Order of the Falcon and winner of the Bastian Prize for his biographies of Gisle Straume and Snorri Sturluson
Wayne Federman (US, born 1959) – Pete Maravich
Elaine Feinstein (En, 1930–2019) – Marina Tsvetaeva, Pushkin, Ted Hughes
Mary Fels (US, 1863–1953) – Joseph Fels
Kitty Ferguson (US, born 1941) – Stephen Hawking
William Fitzstephen (En, died 1190) – Thomas Becket
Amanda Foreman (En/US, born 1968) – Georgiana Cavendish, Duchess of Devonshire
Esther G. Frame (US, 1840–1920) – Esther G. Frame
Antonia Fraser (En, born 1932) – Mary, Queen of Scots and Oliver Cromwell
Russell Freedman (US, 1929–2018) – Abraham Lincoln
Douglas Southall Freeman (US, 1886–1953) – Robert E. Lee and George Washington
Leonie Frieda (Sw/En, born 1956) – Catherine de' Medici
Jean Overton Fuller (En, 1915–2009) – Noor-un-nisa Inayat Khan, Percy Bysshe Shelley, Algernon Charles Swinburne and Sir Francis Bacon
Elizabeth Gaskell (En, 1810–1865) – Charlotte Brontë
Peter Gay (US, 1923–2015) – Sigmund Freud and W. A. Mozart
Gary Giddins (US, born 1948) – Bing Crosby, Charlie Parker and Louis Armstrong
Martin Gilbert (En, 1936–2015) Winston Churchill
Annie Somers Gilchrist (US, 1841–1912)
Josef Greiner (Au, c. 1886–1947) – Adolf Hitler
Adrian Greenwood (En, 1973–2016) – Colin Campbell, 1st Baron Clyde
Peter Guralnick (US, born 1943) – Elvis Presley and Sam Phillips

H–M

Seppo Heikinheimo (Fl, 1938–1997) – Aarre Merikanto, Oskar Merikanto and Martti Talvela
Charles Higham (England/US, 1931–2012) – Errol Flynn, Howard Hughes and Katharine Hepburn
Thomas Jefferson Hogg (En, 1792–1862) – Percy Bysshe Shelley
Richard Holmes (England, born 1945) – Mary Shelley, Coleridge, The Age of Wonder
Michael Holroyd (En, born 1935) – Lytton Strachey
Imogen Holst (En, 1907–1984) – Gustav Holst
Marilla Baker Ingalls (US, 1828–1902) – Mah Po
Walter Isaacson (US, born 1952) – Benjamin Franklin, Steve Jobs and Henry Kissinger
Edward Jablonski (US, 1922–2004) – George Gershwin and Irving Berlin
Elizabeth Jenkins (En, 1905–2010) – Jane Austen, Henry Fielding, Lady Caroline Lamb Joseph Lister and Elizabeth I
Samuel Johnson (En, 1709–1784) – Lives of the Most Eminent English Poets
Ernest Jones (Wl, 1879–1958) – Sigmund Freud
Kathleen Jones (EnAl, born 1946) – Katherine Mansfield
Landon Jones (US, living) – William Clark
Kitty Kelley (US, born 1942) – Frank Sinatra, Elizabeth Taylor and Nancy Reagan
Jacqueline Kent (Al, born 1947) – Kenneth Cook, Beatrice Davis, Julia Gillard and Hephzibah Menuhin
Harriette A. Keyser (US, 1841–1936) — Henry C. Potter
Marvin Kitman (US, born 1929) – George Washington and Bill O'Reilly
Edward Klein (US, born 1937) – Hillary Clinton
Randy Kryn (US, born 1949) — James Bevel
Robert Lacey (En, born 1944) – Elizabeth II, Princess Grace, Henry VIII, Henry Ford and Robert Devereux, 2nd Earl of Essex
Jane Lane (En, 1905–1978) – Titus Oates
Hermione Lee (En, born 1948) – Edith Wharton, Virginia Woolf
Sidney Lee (En, 1856–1926) – Dictionary of National Biography, William Shakespeare and Queen Victoria
J. Michael Lennon (US, born 1942) – Norman Mailer
Santeri Levas (Fl, 1899–1987) – Clara & Robert Schumann, Jean Sibelius
Barbara Levick (En, born 1932) – specialising in Roman emperors
Gail Levin (US, born 1948) – Edward Hopper, Judy Chicago and Lee Krasner
Roger Lewis (Wl, born 1960) – Anthony Burgess
Martha D. Lincoln (US, 1838–1911) — John Wesley Powell
Kenneth S. Lynn (US, 1923–2001) – Mark Twain, Charlie Chaplin and Ernest Hemingway
Brenda Maddox (US/E, 1932–2019) – Elizabeth Taylor, D. H. Lawrence, Nora Joyce, W. B. Yeats and Rosalind Franklin
Norman Mailer (US, 1923–2007) – Marilyn Monroe, Lee Harvey Oswald and Gary Gilmore
Koryun (Am, 5th century) – Mesrop Mashtots
William Manchester (US, 1922–2004) – Winston Churchill, Douglas MacArthur and John F. Kennedy
Cristina Marcano (Ve, born 1960) – Hugo Chávez
Bruce Marshall (Sc, 1899–1987) – Wing Commander F. F. E. Yeo-Thomas
John Matteson (US, born 1961) – Amos Bronson Alcott, Louisa May Alcott and Margaret Fuller
André Maurois (Fr, 1885–1967) – Percy Bysshe Shelley, Lord Byron, Benjamin Disraeli, Victor Hugo, Balzac and Sir Alexander Fleming
David McCullough (US, 1933–2022) – Harry S. Truman, John Adams and Theodore Roosevelt
Merle Miller (US, 1919–1986) – Harry S. Truman and Lyndon B. Johnson
James McGrath Morris (US, born 1954) – Joseph Pulitzer, Charles Chapin, Ethel Payne, Ernest Hemingway, John Dos Passos
Miyoshi Kiyotsura (Jp, 847–918) – Japanese scholar-statesman
Ibn al-Qaisarani (Ab, 1056–1113) – medieval Arab biographer of previous medieval biographers
Simon Sebag Montefiore (En, born 1965) – Grigory Potemkin and Joseph Stalin
Thomas Moore (Ir, 1779–1852) – Richard Brinsley Sheridan, Lord Byron and Lord Edward FitzGerald
Jeffrey Morgan (Ca, living) – Alice Cooper and The Stooges
Ted Morgan (US, born 1932) – William S. Burroughs, W. Somerset Maugham and Franklin D. Roosevelt
Andrew Morton (En, born 1953) – Princess Diana, Monica Lewinsky and Tom Cruise

N–Z

Ira Nadel (Ca, born 1943) – Leon Uris, David Mamet, Tom Stoppard and Leonard Cohen
Alanna Nash (US, born 1950)
Nakane Kōtei (Jp, 1839–1913)
Philip Nel (US, born 1969) – Crockett Johnson and Ruth Krauss
Cornelius Nepos (AR, 100–24 BC)
Nizamuddin Asir Adrawi (IN, 1926–2021)
Iris Origo (En, 1902–1988)
James Parton (US, 1822–1891) – Horace Greeley, Aaron Burr, Andrew Jackson, Benjamin Franklin, Thomas Jefferson and Voltaire
Hesketh Pearson (En, 1887–1964)
F. David Peat (En, 1928–2017) – David Bohm
Plutarch (AG, 46–127)
H. F. M. Prescott (En, 1896–1972) – Mary I of England ("Bloody Mary")
Arnold Rampersad (TT, born 1941) – Langston Hughes
Piers Paul Read (En, born 1941) – Alec Guinness
James Redpath (US, born En, 1833–1891) – John Brown (abolitionist)
E. J. Richmond (US, 1825–1918) – Harriet Hosmer
W. Andrew Robinson (En, born 1957) – Satyajit Ray and Rabindranath Tagore
Romain Rolland (Fr, 1866–1944) – Beethoven, Michelangelo, Leo Tolstoy and Gandhi
Henry Salt (En, 1851–1939) – Shelley, Richard Jefferies and Henry David Thoreau
Carl Sandburg (US, 1878–1967) – Abraham Lincoln
Stacy Schiff (US, born 1961) – United States; Vera Nabokov, Benjamin Franklin, Antoine de Saint-Exupery, Cleopatra and the Witches of Salem
Anton Schindler (Ge, 1795–1864) – Ludwig van Beethoven
Anne Sebba (En, born 1951) – Wallis Simpson
Lee Server (US, living) – Robert Mitchum and Ava Gardner
Miranda Seymour (En, born 1948) – Annabella Milbanke and Ada Lovelace, Hellé Nice, Mary Shelley
Kirit Shelat (In, born 1946) – India
Dawn Langley Simmons (En, 1937–2000) – Princess Margaret, Margaret Rutherford and Jacqueline Kennedy
Roy S. Simmonds (En, 1925–2000) – John Steinbeck, William March and Edward O'Brien
Jean Edward Smith (US, 1932–2019) – Ulysses S. Grant, John Marshall and Lucius D. Clay
Laura J. Snyder (US, born 1964) – Charles Babbage, John F.W. Herschel, William Whewell, Richard Jones, Johannes Vermeer, Antoni van Leeuwenhoek and Oliver Sacks
Dava Sobel (US, born 1947) – John Harrison, Sister Maria Celeste, daughter of Galileo, Galileo
Maynard Solomon (US, 1930–2020) – Beethoven, W. A. Mozart
Leslie Stephen (En, 1832–1904) – Dictionary of National Biography, Samuel Johnson, Alexander Pope, Jonathan Swift George Eliot and Thomas Hobbes
Jane Agnes Stewart (US, 1860–1944) — Frances Willard
Irving Stone (US, 1903–1989)
Lytton Strachey (En, 1880–1932) – eminent Victorians
Marshall Terrill (US, born 1963) – Steve McQueen, Elvis Presley, Johnny Cash, Billy Graham, Pete Maravich
Bankole Timothy (SL, 1923–1994), Kwame Nkrumah
Nick Tosches (US, 1949–2019) – Jerry Lee Lewis, Dean Martin and Sonny Liston
Meriol Trevor (En, 1919–2000) – John Henry Newman, Philip Neri, Pope John XXIII, Thomas Arnold and James II of England
Henri Troyat (Fr, 1911–2007) – Dostoevsky, Leo Tolstoy, Gogol, Catherine the Great, Peter the Great, Ivan the Terrible, Anton Chekhov, Ivan Turgenev, Maxim Gorky and Rasputin
Jenny Uglow (En, born 1947) – Elizabeth Gaskell, William Hogarth, Thomas Bewick and the Lunar Society
Rosa Kershaw Walker (US, 1840s–1909) – eminent Americans
Blanche Warre-Cornish (En, 1848–1922) – William Thackeray
Alison Weir (En, born 1937) – Elizabeth I of England, Eleanor of Aquitane, Mary, Queen of Scots
Theodore White (US, 1915–1986) – Lyndon B. Johnson and Richard Nixon
Alice Willard (US, 1860–1936) – Bertha Baur
A. N. Wilson (En, born 1950) – Sir Walter Scott, John Milton, Hilaire Belloc, Leo Tolstoy, C. S. Lewis, Jesus Iris Murdoch and John Betjeman
Molly Worthen (US, born 1981) – Charles Hill, American diplomat and Yale professor
Marguerite Young (US, 1908–1995) – Eugene V. Debs

Autobiographers

Henry Brooks Adams (US, 1838–1918) – The Education of Henry Adams
Ayaan Hirsi Ali (So, born 1969) – Infidel: My Life
Nirad C. Chaudhuri (In, 1897–1999) – The Autobiography of an Unknown Indian
Henry Cockburn (Sc, 1779–1854) – Memorials of His Time
Frederick Douglass (US, c. 1817–February 20, 1895) – Narrative of the Life of Frederick Douglass, an American Slave (1845), "The Heroic Slave" in Autographs for Freedom (1853), My Bondage and My Freedom (1855) and Life and Times of Frederick Douglass (1881, revised 1892)
Jens Jacob Eschels (Ge, 1757–1842) – first seafarer's autobiography in German
Benjamin Franklin (US, 1706–1790) – The Autobiography of Benjamin Franklin
Mahatma Gandhi (In, 1869–1948) – The Story of My Experiments with Truth
Lee Iacocca (US, 1924–2019) – Iacocca: An Autobiography
Nelson Mandela (SA, 1918–2013) – Long Walk to Freedom
Frank McCourt (Ir/US, 1930–2009) – Angela's Ashes (Pulitzer Prize)
Ronald Skirth (En, 1897–1977) – The Reluctant Tommy

See also

Lists of writers

 
Biographers